I Am Sam (stylized in all lowercase) is a 2001 American drama film co-written and directed by Jessie Nelson, and starring Sean Penn as a father with an intellectual disability, Dakota Fanning as his bright and inquisitive daughter, and Michelle Pfeiffer as his lawyer. Dianne Wiest, Loretta Devine, Richard Schiff, and Laura Dern appear in supporting roles.

Nelson and co-writer Kristine Johnson researched the issues facing adults with intellectual disabilities by visiting the non-profit organization L.A. GOAL (Greater Opportunities for the Advanced Living). They subsequently cast two actors with disabilities, Brad Silverman and Joe Rosenberg, in key roles. The film's title is derived from the  lines "I am Sam / Sam I am" of the book Green Eggs and Ham by Dr. Seuss, which is included in the movie.

The film received polarized reviews from critics and audiences. It grossed over $97 million at the box office, against a production budget of $22 million. For his role as Sam, Penn was highly acclaimed and was nominated for the Academy Award for Best Actor at the 74th Academy Awards in 2002. The film launched the career of child actress Dakota Fanning, who was then seven years old and had only acted in two small roles. She became the youngest actress to be nominated for a Screen Actors Guild Award.

Plot
In 1993, Samuel Dawson, a Starbucks barista with an intellectual disability, becomes the single father of Lucy Diamond Dawson, named after The Beatles song "Lucy in the Sky with Diamonds", following their abandonment by her mother, a homeless woman with whom Sam had a sexual encounter. Sam is well-adjusted and has a supportive group of friends with disabilities, as well as a kind, agoraphobic neighbor, Annie, who takes care of Lucy when Sam cannot. Nearly seven years later in 2001, Sam provides a loving place for precocious Lucy, though she soon surpasses his mental capacity and ability. Other children bully her for having an intellectually disabled father, and she becomes too embarrassed to accept that she is more advanced than he is. 

In danger of losing child custody, Sam gets advice from his friends and also hires a lawyer, Rita Harrison, whose absorption in her work and neglect of her son reveals her to also struggle with her role as a parent. In an attempt to prove that she is not cold, Rita agrees to take on Sam's case pro bono. As they work to secure Sam's rights, Sam helps Rita see her own life anew. This includes encouraging her to leave her philandering husband and repair her fractious relationship with her son.

At the trial, due to pressure from the prosecutor, Sam breaks down after becoming convinced he is not capable of raising Lucy. Afterward, she resides in a foster home with Miranda “Randy” Carpenter, but tries to convince Sam to help her run away. Sam moves so he is near Lucy, so she continually leaves in the middle of the night to go to his apartment, though he immediately returns her. The foster parents, though, decide not to adopt her as they had planned, and return her to Sam. Randy assures him that she will tell the judge he is the best parent for Lucy. In turn, Sam asks Randy if she will help him raise Lucy because he feels she needs a mother figure.

The final scene depicts a soccer game, in which Sam referees and Lucy participates as a player. In attendance are Lucy's former foster family, Sam's friend group, and a newly single Rita with her son.

Cast

Soundtrack

The Grammy Award–nominated soundtrack, in addition to a John Powell score, also has cover versions of songs by the Beatles. The album contents are made up entirely of cover versions of songs by The Beatles, although it was originally intended to consist of the group's original recordings. When producers were unable to obtain the rights to the original tracks, they commissioned artists such as the Black Crowes, Nick Cave, Stereophonics, Eddie Vedder, Sheryl Crow, Sarah McLachlan, Rufus Wainwright, the Wallflowers, Ben Harper, the Vines, and Ben Folds to record the versions released. Penn's brother, Michael Penn, is also featured on a duet with his wife Aimee Mann.

As the movie had been shot and produced to the original Beatles music, the artists had to record their covers to the same musical timing (tempo) as that of the Beatles' original pieces.

Reception

Critical response
On Rotten Tomatoes the film has an approval rating of 35% based on reviews from 145 critics, with an average rating of 4.77/10. The site's consensus reads: "Not only does the manipulative I Am Sam oversimplify a complex issue, it drowns it in treacle." On Metacritic, the film has a score of 28 of 100 based on 33 reviews, indicating "generally unfavorable reviews". Audiences surveyed by CinemaScore gave the film a grade "A" on scale of A to F.

A. O. Scott of the New York Times wrote that "I Am Sam is not a bad movie, and its intentions are unimpeachable. But its sentimentality is so relentless and its narrative so predictable that the life is very nearly squeezed out of it." Variety wrote: "Undone by its best intentions, I Am Sam is an especially insipid example of the Hollywood message movie". Roger Ebert of the Chicago Sun-Times wrote that "every device of the movie's art is designed to convince us Lucy must stay with Sam, but common sense makes it impossible to go the distance with the premise." Ebert also criticized the morality tale character of the movie, saying that "you can't have heroes and villains when the wrong side is making the best sense."

Kevin Thomas of the Los Angeles Times reviewed it positively as a "most inviting and accessible film that turns upon a mental condition that most people would prefer not to think about." Mick LaSalle of the San Francisco Chronicle commended Sean Penn for his performance: "Penn's accuracy, his lack of condescension or sentiment, and his willingness to inhabit his character without any implicit commentary take what might have been the equivalent of an inflated TV movie and elevate it to the level of art." David Denby of The New Yorker, found Michelle Pfeiffer to be the standout: "Pfeiffer, enormously likable in the role, almost saves the movie."

Accolades
Sean Penn was nominated for the Academy Award for Best Actor, the Screen Actors Guild Award for Outstanding Performance by a Male Actor in a Leading Role, the Broadcast Film Critics Association Award for Best Actor and the Satellite Award for Best Actor – Motion Picture Drama.

Dakota Fanning won the Broadcast Film Critics Association Award for Best Young Performer, the Las Vegas Film Critics Society Award for Youth in Film, the Phoenix Film Critics Society Award for Best Youth Actress, the Satellite Special Achievement Award for Outstanding New Talent, and the Young Artist Award for Best Performance in a Feature Film – Young Actress Age Ten or Under. She was also nominated for the Screen Actors Guild Award for Outstanding Performance by a Female Actor in a Supporting Role.

The soundtrack was nominated for the Grammy Award for Best Compilation Soundtrack Album for a Motion Picture, Television or Other Visual Media.

The film won the inaugural Stanley Kramer Award from the Producers Guild of America, and was nominated for the Humanitas Prize and the Japan Academy Prize for Outstanding Foreign Language Film.

References

External links

 
 

2000s English-language films
2000s American films
2001 films
2001 drama films
American courtroom films
American drama films
Developmental disabilities
Films_about_autism
Films about intellectual disability
Films directed by Jessie Nelson
Fiction about origami
Films scored by John Powell
Films set in Los Angeles
Films shot in Los Angeles
New Line Cinema films
Films about father–daughter relationships
Films about disability